Parachlaenius is a genus of beetles in the family Carabidae, containing the following species:

 Parachlaenius bequaerti Alluaud, 1930 
 Parachlaenius diacritus Alluaud, 1930 
 Parachlaenius discolor Alluaud, 1930 
 Parachlaenius emini Kolbe, 1894 
 Parachlaenius marshalli Straneo, 1947 
 Parachlaenius punctatus (Laferte-Senectere, 1853) 
 Parachlaenius rhodesianus Straneo, 1947 
 Parachlaenius ruandanus Burgeon, 1935 
 Parachlaenius trochantericus (Kolbe, 1894) 
 Parachlaenius violaceus Peringuey, 1899

References

Licininae